Dhirendra Kishore Chakravarti (1902after 1985) was an Indian geologist and palaentologist, who worked at Banaras Hindu University in the Geological Museum (now part of the Institute of Science).

In 1934, he was the first Indian to describe a species of dinosaur, Brachypodosaurus gravis (now considered dubious). In 1935, he contested the interpretation of Lametasaurus indicus as an armoured dinosaur, arguing that it was a chimera.

In 1982, the Geological Society of India organised a Festschrift in his honour.

Publications 

  Cited in Charles Lewis Camp: Bibliography of Fossil Vertebrates 1928-1933; Geological Society of America; 1940; ASIN B001O2KAIK
 
 
  Cited in Camp, C. L., Allison H. J., Nichols, R. H.: Bibliography of Fossil Vertebrates 1954-1958; Geological Society of America; 1 May 1964; ASIN B001OPDDKE

References 

1902 births
Date of birth missing
Place of birth missing
Year of death missing
Place of death missing
20th-century Indian geologists
Indian paleontologists
20th-century Indian zoologists